Poornima Indrajith (née Poornima Mohan; born 13 December) is an Indian actress and television presenter who works in mainly in Malayalam cinema.

Early and personal life
Poornima Indrajith was born to Mohan and Shanthi, in a Tamil family that settled in Kerala. Her mother tongue is Tamil. Her father is a practising lawyer and her mother runs a dance school. She has a younger sister Priya Mohan, who is also an actress.

Poornima is married to actor Indrajith Sukumaran. She has two daughters including singer Prarthana Indrajith. She is the daughter-in-law of the late Sukumaran and Mallika Sukumaran. Prithviraj Sukumaran is her brother-in-law.

Career

Poornima started her career as a model and then acted in Successful Tamil TV serial Kolangal. She then acted in many TV serials in Malayalam Television serial industry.Following this she acted in supporting roles in movies, including Meghamalhar (2001), Valliettan (2000) and Randam Bhavam (2001).

After 17 years, she made a comeback with Virus which was included in The Hindu's top 25 Malayalam films of the decade.

Filmography

As actor 
 All films are in Malayalam language unless otherwise noted.

As dubbing artist

Television

Television shows as host

Television shows as judge

Television serials

References

External links
 
 Poornima Mohan at MSI

Actresses from Thiruvananthapuram
Actresses in Malayalam cinema
Costume designers of Malayalam cinema
Actresses in Tamil cinema
Actresses in Hindi cinema
Indian women fashion designers
Living people
Actresses in Malayalam television
Indian television actresses
21st-century Indian actresses
Indian film actresses
21st-century Indian designers
Businesspeople from Thiruvananthapuram
Businesswomen from Kerala
Indian Tamil people
Actresses in Tamil television
Female models from Kerala
Indian voice actresses
Indian women television presenters
Indian television presenters
Indian female dancers
Dancers from Kerala
Women artists from Kerala
St. Teresa's College alumni
Year of birth missing (living people)